The Anti-Fascist Committee for a Free Germany (German: Antifaschistische Komitee Freies Deutschland, or AKFD) was an organization of former Wehrmacht soldiers modeled after the National Committee for a Free Germany. The organization was formed in Greece during the last months of the German occupation and lasted from August to December 1944. Falk Harnack was one of its co-founders.

Historical background 

During the period of the Axis occupation of Greece (1941-44) a large number of German anti-fascist soldiers defected from the ranks of the German armed forces (Wehrmacht) and joined the Greek partisans of the Greek People's Liberation Army (Greek: Ελληνικός Λαϊκός Απελευθερωτικός Στρατός (ΕΛΑΣ), Ellinikós Laïkós Apeleftherotikós Stratós (ELAS)). ELAS was the military wing of the National Liberation Front (Greece) (Greek: Εθνικό Απελευθερωτικό Μέτωπο, Ethnikó Apeleftherotikó Métopo (EAM)). Defections accelerated from the summer of 1943 onwards, as military units belonging to the penal 999th Light Afrika Division (Wehrmacht) (Strafdivision 999) were transferred to Greece.

Initially the German anti-fascists were directly integrated into ELAS divisions and were not organized in special, independent, German partisan units. Soon, however, inspired by the creation of the National Committee for a Free Germany (German: Nationalkomitee Freies Deutschland- NKFD) by anti-fascist German soldiers and officers in the Eastern Front, plans were made to set up a similar committee in Greece. Another similar Committee who sympathized with the resistance was created by German soldiers, prisoners of war, defectors and emigrants on the Western front known as "Free Germany Movement for the West”, officially Comité Allemagne libre pour l'Ouest (CALPO)).

Forming 
Two persons were central in the creation of the AKFD (Anti-Fascist Committee for a Free Germany) in Greece. 

 Falk Harnack, who had been working directly at the ELAS headquarters in Kastania, Trikala (municipality of Kalambaka) since early 1944. 
 Gerhard Reinhardt, who wrote the German-language call for the founding of the Anti-fascist Committee for a Free Germany (AKFD) in the EAM newspaper Eleftheri Ellada (Ελεύθερη Ελλάδα) in 1944.

In late July 1944, after discussions with a Soviet military mission, there was a meeting in ELAS headquarters in Kastania, Trikala, between the ELAS High Command, Falk Harnack and Gerhard Reinhardt. The meeting was attended by the ELAS commander, Stefanos Sarafis; the ELAS legal advisor, Konstantinos Despotopoulos; and EAM's Minister of Culture Petros Kokkalis.

The formal forming of the AKFD took place on August 10, 1944, as a German-language "Appeal to all German soldiers in Greece" was published in the EAM newspaper Eleftheri Ellada (Ελεύθερη Ελλάδα) to actively fight against Hitler's Wehrmacht. The AKFD was recognized by telegram from the management of the NKFD in Moscow. From late August, radio broadcasts from the NKFD from Moscow were also regularly listened to at the EAM-ELAS headquarters.

Structure 
The AKFD was headed by the central committee, consisting of the political director, Falk Harnack, Gerhard Reinhardt, who was responsible for organizational matters, and other members (Willi Schrade, Paul Fritz, Erich Klose, Hans Schüller, Franz Oberweger, Wilhelm Hansen, Robert Hermann, Rudolf Schiller and others), mostly defectors from the XXI Fortress Infantry Battalion of the penal 999th Light Afrika Division (Wehrmacht), who later became commanders of the company units (Hundertschaft) that were formed. They were to be made up of the German soldiers already fighting at ELAS and were to be further strengthened by prisoners of war and defectors of Wehrmacht who had been converted to the cause by propaganda. The company units were to be assigned to an ELAS regiment or division, organised in groups of 30 men, which were in turn to be divided into cells of 10 men.

From 14 August 1944, three instructors (Falk Harnack, Gerhard Reinhardt and Kurt Adam) set out to organize the German anti-fascist defectors in Greece in different AKFD units along various geographical areas of Greece:

Falk Harnack, who used the alias "Ikarus", operated in the areas of the central highlands and towards the west coast of Greece, close to the borders with Albania. Harnack organised the following units:

 Rumeli Company (Hundertschaft Rumeli) directly under the command of ELAS headquarters
 Agrinion Company (Hundertschaft Agrinion) with 21 men with commander and political director Kurt Lohberger (formerly XXI Bat. 999) linked to the 34th and 42nd ELAS regiments

Gerhard Reinhardt operated in the northeast areas of Greece, areas close to the city of Volos and towards Thessaloniki and remained close to the 13th ELAS division. Reinhardt organised the following units:
 Volos Company (Hundertschaft Volos) with 51 men, then until October 1944 about 90 men, command Willi Schrade (formerly XXI Bat. 999) with the 54th ELAS regiment. 
 Larisa Company (Hundertschaft Larisa) with 38 men, under the command of Erich Klose (formerly XXI Bat. 999)
 Saloniki Company (Hundertschaft Saloniki) with about 30 men (formerly 999 and other defectors) since Sept./Oct. 1944 at the 11th ELAS division; this company was formerly known as "German Antifascist Committee of Macedonia, Free Germany"

Kurt Adam was to travel to the Peloponnese in Tropaia, Arcadia, to work with the 3rd ELAS division in order to organize approximately 60 German anti-fascists in AKFD companies in the south parts of Greece, in Peloponnese, in late August 1944. However, according to Falk Harnack, Kurt Adam defected to British units on his journey.

References 

German resistance to Nazism
Organizations established in 1944